The 2001 Miller Lite 200 was a Championship Auto Racing Teams (CART) motor race held on August 12, 2001, at Mid-Ohio Sports Car Course in Lexington, Ohio, USA. It was the 13th round of the 2001 CART FedEx Championship Series season. Team Penske dominated the event, with Gil de Ferran taking pole position and Hélio Castroneves finishing ahead of de Ferran in the race itself. Patrick Carpentier finished 3rd.

Castroneves had earned his third win of the season and the last of his CART career by taking advantage of a faster pitstop during the first half of the race and staying ahead the rest of the way. Castroneves was now within one point of championship leader Kenny Bräck, who collided with his teammate in the race and ended up three laps down in 20th place. de Ferran was also continuing a streak of high points-paying positions, and his podium at the race put him third overall. Carpentier scored his third consecutive podium and continued a run of good results for Forsythe Racing.

The race hinged on pitstops and fuel strategy, as many drivers gambled on off-schedule stops to try to make up positions on a track that was notoriously difficult to pass on. Nevertheless, it was Team Penske's conventional strategy that allowed both drivers to finish 1–2.

Qualifying

Race

Notes
– Includes one bonus point for leading the most laps.
– Includes one bonus point for being the fastest qualifier.

Race statistics
Lead changes: 3 among 3 drivers

Standings after the race

Drivers' standings 

Constructors' standings

Manufacturer's Standings

References

Miller Lite 200
Miller Lite 200
Indy 200 at Mid-Ohio